The Oluf Larsen House, at 75 S. 100 West in Ephraim, Utah, is a historic pair-house which was built in 1870.  It was listed on the National Register of Historic Places in 1983.

It is a one-and-a-half-story adobe house with elements of Greek Revival style.  In the early 1900s it was plastered and painted to simulate brick, and then later it was stuccoed.  It has paired internal stove chimneys and "is a rare example of the TYPE I pair house."

It was home of Oluf Larsen, who was born in Drammen, Norway in 1836.  After converting to the LDS church in 1857, he immigrated to Salt Lake City, Utah, in 1861.

The house was home, after 1890, of Ellen G. Dorius, a polygamous wife of C.C.N. Dorius.

The house is on the east side of a north-south street;  its front, however, faces north.

References

Pair-houses		
Houses on the National Register of Historic Places in Utah
Greek Revival architecture in Utah
Houses completed in 1870
Sanpete County, Utah